Perdo Luis Valverde Flores (born 6 April 1988) is a Mexican retired professional footballer who played for Delfines and Cruz Azul Hidalgo in the Ascenso MX.

Honours
Mexico U17
FIFA U-17 World Championship: 2005

References

1988 births
Liga MX players
Living people
Mexican footballers
Association football midfielders